As One is an album by the Memphis, Tennessee funk band The Bar-Kays released on Mercury Records in November 1980. The album reached number six on the Billboard Soul Albums chart.

Track listing
"Boogie Body Land" 	5:49 	
"Say It Through Love" 	3:54 	
"Work It Out" 	4:30 	
"Body Fever" 	4:10 	
"As One"   	 4:26   	
"Take The Time To Love Somebody" 	4:09 	
"Open Your Heart" 	4:12 	
"Deliver Us" 	4:53

Charts

Singles

References

External links
 The Bar-Kays-As One at Discogs

1980 albums
Bar-Kays albums
Mercury Records albums